List of artillery platforms used on aircraft with a calibre larger than 37mm.

A 
 102mm Ansaldo 1941
 76.2mm APK Recoilless Rifle

B 
 50mm BK 5 Cannon
 Bofors 40 mm

C

H 
 57mm Ho-401 Cannon

M 
 M102 howitzer
 M5 75mm gun

N 
 Nudelman Suranov NS-45 Cannon

O 
 Ordnance QF 6-Pounder Class M
 Ordnance QF 32 Pounder/3.7 inch AA gun

P 
 75mm Pak 40

V 
 47mm Vickers P

See also
 List of artillery
 List of artillery by country
 List of World War II artillery
 List of naval guns
 List of weapons
 List of tank main guns
 List of grenade launchers
 List of recoilless rifles

Artillery
 
Artillery by type
Lists of artillery
List of aircraft artillery